Zhou Zeqi (born 18 September 1997) is a Chinese badminton player.

Achievements

BWF World Tour 
The BWF World Tour, announced on 19 March 2017 and implemented in 2018, is a series of elite badminton tournaments, sanctioned by Badminton World Federation (BWF). The BWF World Tour are divided into six levels, namely World Tour Finals, Super 1000, Super 750, Super 500, Super 300 (part of the HSBC World Tour), and the BWF Tour Super 100.

Men's singles

References

External links 
 

1997 births
Living people
Chinese male badminton players